Stuyvenbergh is a Brussels Metro station on line 6. It opened on 5 July 1985 and is located under the intersection of the /, the / and the /, in Laeken, in the north-west of the City of Brussels, Belgium. The underground station is named after the Castle of Stuyvenberg, located east of the station in Laeken Park.

External links

Brussels metro stations
Railway stations opened in 1985
City of Brussels
1985 establishments in Belgium